Leslie Roy Powell (29 July 1912 – 12 December 1967) was an Australian rules footballer who played with Essendon and South Melbourne in the Victorian Football League (VFL).

Notes

External links 
		

Les Powell's playing statistics from The VFA Project

1912 births
1967 deaths
Australian rules footballers from Melbourne
Essendon Football Club players
Sydney Swans players
Oakleigh Football Club players
People from Brunswick, Victoria